Dave Bulthuis (born 28 June 1990, in Purmerend) is a Dutch football player who plays for Suwon Samsung Bluewings in South Korea K League 1.

Club career
Bulthuis formerly played for FC Utrecht in the Eredivisie. He moved abroad to play for German Second Bundesliga side FC Nürnberg in summer 2014.

On 7 July 2017, Bulthuis signed a three-year contract with Azerbaijan Premier League side Gabala FK.

In January 2019, he left SC Heerenveen for Ulsan Hyundai.

Career statistics

Honours

Individual
K League 1 Best XI: 2021

Club
 Ulsan Hyundai
AFC Champions League: 2020

References

External links
 
 Voetbal International profile 
 Dave Bulthuis Interview

1990 births
Living people
People from Purmerend
Dutch footballers
Association football fullbacks
FC Utrecht players
1. FC Nürnberg players
Gabala FC players
SC Heerenveen players
Ulsan Hyundai FC players
Eredivisie players
2. Bundesliga players
Azerbaijan Premier League players
Dutch expatriate footballers
Expatriate footballers in Germany
Dutch expatriate sportspeople in Germany
Expatriate footballers in Azerbaijan
K League 1 players
Dutch expatriate sportspeople in Azerbaijan
Footballers from North Holland
Expatriate footballers in South Korea
Dutch expatriate sportspeople in South Korea
Suwon Samsung Bluewings players